List of Canadian English dictionaries:

 Canadian Oxford Dictionary 
 Collins Canadian Dictionary 
 A Dictionary of Canadianisms on Historical Principles 
 Gage Canadian Dictionary 
 Houghton Mifflin Canadian Dictionary 
 ITP Nelson Canadian Dictionary 
 Penguin Canadian Dictionary 
 Reader's Digest Webster's Canadian Dictionary and Thesaurus 
 Webster's Canadian Dictionary 
 Winston Canadian Dictionary

Variants

Dictionary of Prince Edward Island English 
Dictionary of Newfoundland English 
Dictionary of Newfoundland & Labrador 
Dictionary of Cape Breton English

See also

Canadian English
English dictionaries
English language in Canada